35th Division or 35th Infantry Division may refer to:

Infantry divisions
 35th Division (German Empire)
 35th Reserve Division (German Empire)
 35th Infantry Division (Wehrmacht), Germany
 35th SS-Police Grenadier Division, Germany
 35th Division (United Kingdom)
 35th Infantry Division (United States)
 35th Infantry Division (Poland)
 35th Rifle Division (Soviet Union)
 35th Guards Rifle Division, Soviet Union
 35th Division (Imperial Japanese Army)
 35th Division (Spain)

Other divisions
 35th Air Division, United States
 35th Rocket Division, Soviet Union and Russia

See also
 35th Army (disambiguation)
 35th Corps (disambiguation)
 35th Regiment (disambiguation)